Alfred Herrhausen (30 January 1930 in Essen – 30 November 1989 in Bad Homburg vor der Höhe) was a German banker and the Chairman of Deutsche Bank, who was assassinated in 1989. He was a member of the Steering Committee of the Bilderberg Group and from 1971 onwards a member of Deutsche Bank's management board. An advisor to Helmut Kohl and a proponent of a unified European economy, he was also an influential figure in shaping the policies towards developing nations. He was assassinated, probably by the West German far-left terrorist group Red Army Faction, when an explosively formed projectile penetrated his armoured convoy.

Assassination

Herrhausen was killed by a sophisticated roadside bomb shortly after leaving his home in Bad Homburg on 30 November 1989. He was being chauffeured to work in his armoured Mercedes-Benz, with bodyguards in both a lead vehicle and another following behind. The 7 kg bomb was hidden in a bag on a bicycle parked next to the road that the assassins knew Herrhausen would be traveling in his convoy. The bicycle had been consistently parked sans explosive in the same location along Herrhausen's route for an extended period of time before the assassination, and it was therefore ignored by Herrhausen's security. The bomb was detonated when Herrhausen's car interrupted a beam of infrared light as it passed the bicycle. The bomb targeted the most vulnerable area of Herrhausen's car – the door where he was sitting – and required split-second timing to overcome the car's special armour plating. The bomb utilized a Misznay–Schardin mechanism. A copper plate, placed between the explosive and the target, was deformed and projected by the force of the explosion. The detonation resulted in a mass of copper being projected toward the car at a speed of nearly two kilometers per second, efficiently penetrating the armoured Mercedes. Herrhausen's legs were severed and he bled to death.

Members of the Red Army Faction claimed that Vladimir Putin was their handler in Dresden.

Aftermath

No one has ever been charged with the murder. For a long time, the German federal prosecutor's office listed Andrea Klump and Christoph Seidler of the Red Army Faction as the only suspects. The Federal Criminal Police Office (Germany) presented a chief witness, Siegfried Nonne, who later retracted his statements in which he claimed to have sheltered four terrorists in his home. His half-brother Hugo Föller furthermore declared that no other persons had been at the flat at the time. On 1 July 1992 German television broadcast Nonne's explanations of how he was coached and threatened by the Verfassungsschutz, the German internal intelligence agency, to become the main witness. In the same year, the Alfred Herrhausen Society was established to honour his memory. In 2004 the federal prosecutor dropped the charges against the Red Army Faction; the investigation was to continue without naming a suspect. Certain German and US media connected the assassination of Alfred Herrhausen to the Staatssicherheitsdienst (Stasi) of the GDR. 

In 2008, journalist Carolin Emcke published Stumme Gewalt (Mute Force), a memorial to Herrhausen, her godfather, encouraging dialogues between groups in societies, dialogues without violence, revenge and disrespect. She received the Theodor Wolff Prize for the text.

In popular culture
The 2001 German documentary film Black Box BRD retells the lives and deaths of Herrhausen and Wolfgang Grams, a RAF member who was a major suspect in the attack on Herrhausen.
The assassination is depicted in Deutschland 89 episode 4.

See also
List of unsolved murders

References

External links 
 Gravesite at Waldfriedhof Bad Homburg, Germany. "We must say what we think. We must do what we say. We must also be what we do."

1930 births
1989 deaths
Assassinated German people
Businesspeople from Essen
Deaths by improvised explosive device
Deutsche Bank people
German bankers
German chairpersons of corporations
German corporate directors
German murder victims
Male murder victims
Members of the Steering Committee of the Bilderberg Group
Unsolved murders in Germany
Victims of the Red Army Faction